Rainmaker is the 1980 debut album by Kevin Moore, now more commonly known as Keb' Mo'. The album features the songs "Rainmaker" and "Anybody Seen My Girl" which were each re-released in Moore's later releases Slow Down and Keb' Mo' respectively.

Track listing
 "I Intend to Love You" (Kevin Moore, Andrea Weltman)
 "Break Down the Walls" (Kevin Moore, John Lewis Parker)
 "Anybody Seen My Girl" (Kevin Moore)
 "Speak Your Mind" (Kevin Moore, Alex Brown)
 "Rainmaker" (Kevin Moore, Pat Shepherd)
 "The Way You Hold Me" (Kevin Moore)
 "Rainy Day People (Rainy Day Lady, Rainy Day Man)" (Kevin Moore, Alex Brown)
 "Holding on to You" (Bill Martin)

Personnel
Kevin Moore - vocals, acoustic and electric guitar
Bobbi Walker - additional lead vocals
Caleb Quaye - electric guitar
Jervonny Collier - bass guitar
Greg Mathieson, Michael King - keyboards
Ian Underwood - synthesizer
Ricky Lawson - drums
Holden Raphael, Paulinho Da Costa - percussion
Kim Hutchcroft - alto and tenor saxophone, alto flute
Gary Grant, Jerry Hey - trumpet, flugelhorn
Bill Reichenbach - trombone, bass trombone
Alex Brown, Bill Champlin, Carmen Grillo, Carmen Twillie, Marva Holcolm, Tom Kelly, Venette Gloud - backing vocals
Victor Hall - string arrangements

References

1980 debut albums
Keb' Mo' albums